Major Lawrence Kimball (25 October 1900 – 30 December 1971) was a Conservative Party politician elected as the Member of Parliament for Loughborough between 1931 and 1945.

Lawrence Kimball, born in 1900, was the son of Marcus Morton Kimball and Jeannie Lawrence Perkins and the father of Marcus, Lord Kimball.

References

Conservative Party (UK) MPs for English constituencies
UK MPs 1931–1935
UK MPs 1935–1945
1900 births
1971 deaths
Members of the Parliament of the United Kingdom for Loughborough